Slater & Charlie Go Camping is a Interactive storybook developed and published by Sierra On-Line. It was released for MS-DOS and Macintosh on May 19, 1993. It is a third-person perspective educational game.

Reception
Computer Gaming World in 1993 called Slater & Charlie "a remarkably smooth blend of children's storybooks with Saturday morning cartoons".

References

External links
Slater & Charlie Go Camping at MobyGames

1993 video games
Children's educational video games
DOS games
Classic Mac OS games
ScummVM-supported games
Sierra Discovery games
Sierra Entertainment games
Single-player video games
Video games developed in the United States